Paris is a historical novel by Edward Rutherfurd published in 2013, which charts the history of Paris from 1261 to 1968.

The novel follows six core families set in locales such as Montmartre, Notre Dame and Boulevard Saint-Germain. It includes a map of old Paris. Later titled Paris: A Novel.

Plot 
The novel follows six families: the Le Sourds (a revolutionary family), the de Cygnes (a noble family), the Renards (a bourgeois family of merchants), the Blanchards (a family of Napoleon supporters), the Gascons (a family from the slums) and the Jacobs (an art dealing Jewish family). The book follows two timelines throughout, containing a large number of characters and is based on real events.

Reception 
"This saga is filled with historical detail and a huge cast of characters, fictional and real, spanning generations and centuries. But Paris, with its art, architecture, culture and couture, is the undisputed main character." - Fort Worth Star-Telegram

"Both Paris, the venerable City of Light, and Rutherfurd, the undisputed master of the multigenerational historical saga, shine in this sumptuous urban epic." — Booklist

A columnist for The Telegraph, however, gave it a rather scathing review calling the novel "swollen", "encyclopedic", and saying further that "character and plot are blithely sacrificed on the altar of trivia with every turn of the page."

Publication details 
 2013, UK, Hodder, 752 pages.
 2013, USA, Doubleday, hard cover, 832 pages, First Edition.
 2014, USA, Ballantine Books, paperback, 832 pages.

References 

2013 British novels
Novels by Edward Rutherfurd
Historical novels
Novels set in Paris
History of Paris
Doubleday (publisher) books